The 1985–86 Omani League was the 12th edition of the top football league in Oman. Dhofar S.C.S.C. were the defending champions, having won the previous 1984–85 Omani League season. Fanja SC emerged as the champions of the 1985–86 Omani League with a total of five points in the Championship Play-off round.

Teams
This season the league had 10 teams.

Stadia and locations

First round

Group A

Group B

Championship playoff

Top level Omani football league seasons
1985–86 in Omani football
Oman